Lemaireia loepoides is a species of moth of the family Saturniidae first described by Arthur Gardiner Butler in 1880. It is found on Borneo, Sumatra and Peninsular Malaysia.

References

Saturniinae
Moths described in 1880